Fesoterodine (INN, used as the fumarate under the brand name Toviaz) is an antimuscarinic drug developed by Schwarz Pharma AG to treat overactive bladder syndrome (OAB). It was approved by the European Medicines Agency in April 2007, the US Food and Drug Administration on October 31, 2008  and Health Canada on February 9, 2012. 

Fesoterodine is a prodrug. It is broken down into its active metabolite, desfesoterodine, by plasma esterases.

Efficacy
Fesoterodine has the advantage of allowing more flexible dosage than other muscarinic antagonists. Its tolerability and side effects are similar to other muscarinic antagonists and as a new drug seems unlikely to make great changes in practices of treatment for overactive bladder.

A Japanese study from 2017, showed that urgency and urge incontinence are improved after 3 days administration of the drug, with full efficacy able to be judged after 7 days administration. Overactive bladder was found to be resolved in 88% of patients after seven days usage.

References

External links 
 

Muscarinic antagonists
Prodrugs
Primary alcohols
Isobutyrate esters
Pfizer brands
Diisopropylamino compounds
Phenol esters